Donald Seymour Arden  (12 April 1916 – 18 July 2014) was a British-Australian Anglican archbishop, and campaigner for issues of justice and equality.

Ministry
Arden was educated at St Peter's College, Adelaide and the University of Leeds. He was ordained deacon in 1939 and priest in 1940 after studying at the College of the Resurrection, Mirfield. His first posts were curacies in Hatcham and Nettleden. In 1944 he joined the Pretoria African Mission, eventually becoming Director of the Usuthu Mission in Swaziland.

From 1961 to 1971 he was the Bishop of Nyasaland/Malawi – as Bishop of Nyasaland until Malawian independence in 1964 and as Bishop of Malawi thereafter. When the diocese split in 1971, he became bishop of one of the two new dioceses as Bishop of Southern Malawi. Also in that year, he became Archbishop of Central Africa, and held both posts until retiring in 1980.

Having given up the archbishopric, Arden returned to the UK to become priest in charge of St Margaret's church Uxbridge, where he served from 1981 to 1986.

Arden had a great love of Africa and campaigned tirelessly for the rights of indigenous African people. Within the Church he made widespread provision for the education of indigenous black African priests, and campaigned for the appointment of indigenous bishops. It was a matter of pride to him that he was the last white Archbishop of Central Africa.

Retirement
In retirement Arden served as an honorary assistant priest at St Alban's Church in North Harrow, and as an honorary assistant bishop in the Diocese of London. He gave up these roles in 2011 and moved to Romsey, Hampshire, where he lived the final years of his life. In December 2011, Arden celebrated 50 years of episcopal ministry with his family at St Paul's Cathedral, London. He was consecrated (as Bishop of Nyasaland) on 30 November 1961.

He died at home in Romsey, Hampshire on 18 July 2014, aged 98. His family announced that he would be cremated in an African banana leaf coffin on 31 July 2014.

References

|-

1916 births
2014 deaths
People educated at St Peter's College, Adelaide
Alumni of the University of Leeds
Alumni of the College of the Resurrection
English Anglican missionaries
Anglican bishops of Nyasaland
Anglican bishops in Malawi
Anglican bishops of Southern Malawi
20th-century Anglican bishops in Malawi
Anglican archbishops of Central Africa
20th-century Anglican archbishops
Commanders of the Order of the British Empire
Anglican missionaries in Eswatini
Anglican missionaries in Malawi